The 2020 North Dakota Fighting Hawks football team represented the University of North Dakota during the 2020–21 NCAA Division I FCS football season. Led by seventh-year head coach Bubba Schweigert, they played their home games at the Alerus Center as first-year members of the Missouri Valley Football Conference.

Previous season

The Fighting Hawks finished the 2019 season with a record of 7–5 and earned a berth to the FCS Playoffs, where they lost to Nicholls.

Schedule
North Dakota's game scheduled against Valparaiso was canceled on July 27 due to the Pioneer Football League's decision to play a conference-only schedule due to the COVID-19 pandemic.

References

North Dakota
North Dakota Fighting Hawks football seasons
North Dakota
North Dakota Fighting Hawks football
North Dakota Fighting Hawks football